The Gallows Bird (Swedish: Olycksfågeln) is a 2006 novel by Camilla Läckberg, translated by Steven T. Murray in 2011. It is the fourth psychological thriller written by Läckberg.

Synopsis
Patrik (police officer) and Erica (writer) have reconnected, had a child and are moving headlong into matrimony. Problems sidelined when a chaotic alcohol-fueled party ends with the death of an unpopular contestant on a reality TV show. A local woman is found dead, apparently the victim of a car crash: the first in a spate of seemingly inexplicable accidents in Tanumshede. The car reeks of alcohol and the initial assumption is that it is a drunk driver accident. 

Soon it becomes clear there's a serial assassin in the vicinity. As TV cameras shadow the reality show stars' every move, relations with the locals are strained to the breaking point. A piece of evidence reveals that a pair of seemingly disparate homicides are linked, and a pattern emerges of similar homicides spread over many years—in different regions of Sweden; slowly Patrick realizes that these cases are more closely linked than he had thought. Patrick also has his own set of problems to contend with: a wedding to arrange, and Erica's sister Anna living with them—he's experiencing stress.

References 

Swedish crime novels
Novels by Camilla Läckberg
Novels set in Sweden
2006 Swedish novels